Henrik Irgang Elsner (born 1954) is a Danish scientist and entrepreneur.
Educated as M.Sc. and Ph.D. in organic chemistry at University of Copenhagen. MBA in financing from Copenhagen Business College.

References

1954 births
Danish chemists
Living people
University of Copenhagen alumni